Valery Vigilucci (born 15 April 1997) is an Italian footballer who plays as a midfielder for Serie A club ACF Fiorentina and the Italy women's national team.

References

1997 births
Living people
People from Volterra
Sportspeople from the Province of Pisa
Italian women's footballers
Women's association football midfielders
Serie A (women's football) players
Fiorentina Women's F.C. players
Italy women's international footballers
ACF Firenze players
Footballers from Tuscany